Sernagiotto is a surname. Notable people with the surname include:

Pedro Sernagiotto (1908–1965), Italian-Brazilian footballer
Remo Sernagiotto (1955–2020), Italian politician